Kindbergs is a Swedish dansband. The band was originally known when it was founded in 1986 as Sten-Åkes Jr.. The name was changed to Kindbergs in 1989. The band played various genres but later on started playing country music almost exclusively. The long-time bassist member Kent Kindberg left the band after two decades of playing and was replaced by Ola Jonsson earlier bass player in another Swedish dansband called Svänzons.

The album Nu Reser We Västerut released on the 25th anniversary of the band, was a great commercial success, charting on the Swedish Albums Chart.

Members
Henrik "Henke" Svensson - keyboards, saxophone, accordion, vocals
Joakim "Jocke" Ekelund - vocals, guitar, keyboards, saxophone
Ola Jonsson - Bass, vocals (2008–present)
Conny Falk - drums

Former members
Kent Kindberg - bass, vocals (1986-2008)

Discography

Albums
1988: Kindbergs
1990: De é fredag
2001: Donna Bella Donna
2004: Nu och för alltid
2007: Collection 20
2008: Boots & änglar

Singles
(Those with * charted in the Swedish Svensktoppen charts)
1994: "I ett litet hus"
1996: "Det vackraste jag vet"
1998: "Ännu blommar kärleken"*
1998: "Du är så vacker"*
1999: "Louise"*
1999: "Ge mig en chans"*
2000: "Julia"
2001: "Donna Bella Donna"*
2002: "Sweet Louisa"
2002: "Himlen i min famn"
2003: "Sommarvindar"
2004: "Nu och för alltid"
2008: "Ner till södern"

References

External links
Official website

Dansbands